KAYL may refer to:

 KAYL (AM), a radio station (990 AM) licensed to Storm Lake, Iowa, United States
 KAYL-FM, a radio station (101.7 FM) licensed to Storm Lake, Iowa, United States

See also 

 Kayl, a town in Luxembourg
Karyl